Eupselia syncapna is a moth in the family Depressariidae. It was described by Edward Meyrick in 1920. It is found in Australia, where it has been recorded from Queensland.

The forewings are dark purplish fuscous, on the median area with obscure dark brownish transverse incomplete stride and with a slightly oblique dark brown streak from the middle of the dorsum reaching half across the wing, edged anteriorly with some obscure whitish irroration. There is an obscure pale fuscous transverse mark on the end of the cell. The hindwings are pale ochreous yellow, the apex and termen slenderly suffused dark fuscous.

References

Moths described in 1920
Eupselia